Chambœuf may refer to the following places in France:

Chambœuf, Côte-d'Or, a commune in the department of Côte-d'Or
Chambœuf, Loire, a commune in the department of Loire